Eftalya Işılay (189115 March 1939), née Anastasia Georgiadou, best known as Deniz Kızı Eftalya (Turkish for "Efthalia the  Mermaid"), was an Ottoman and later Turkish singer of Greek ethnicity.

Early years
Anastasia Georgiadou  was born  Ottoman Greek in 1891 in the Büyükdere  suburb of Istanbul, then Constantinople in the Ottoman Empire, present-day Turkey. Her father was a Captain of the Ottoman Gendarmerie.

At a very young age, she accompanied her instrument-playing father in  singing at guest gatherings. Later, she sang to her father's music on a rowboat on Bosphorus off Büyükdere among 20-30 rowboats during full moon at summer nights. She sometimes   sang alone in the sea  at night. People at the seashore, listening to her singing, nicknamed her  ("Efthalia the  Mermaid") from the age of five or six.

Professional career
She sang cantos and folk songs on stage at the music-performance coffee houses in Galata quarter. Her music career changed after her marriage to Sadi (later Işılay), a notable violinist. She performed together with her husband. Between 1923 and 1926, she recorded her songs for Pathé Records in Paris, France, where she lived with her husband. During this time, she gave concerts in Europe and the Middle East. She was the first non-Muslim singer, who recorded 56 songs of about one hundred works compiled from Anatolia for  Columbia Records, on behalf of the Dâr-ül Elhan ("House of Melodies"), today Istanbul University State Conservatory. To avoid ethnic tensions, she used Turkish pseudonyms instead of her original name on the first 30 or so records she made. The number of her records after 1927 neared 50. After her songs were acclaimed at performances before President Mustafa Kemal Atatürk, from 1930 on she did not avoid using her name. She used the name "Deniz Kızı Eftalya" on most of her records except for eleven of them. In 1934, she recorded for the label His Master's Voice under the name "Eftalya Sadi", using her husband's given name as her family name, just before the surname law took effect in Turkey.

She was associated with Greek-Turkish master musicians and composers, oud player Yorgo Bacanos (1900–1977) and his brother, kemenche, and oud virtuoso  (1888–1950). She was so popular under the nickname "Deniz Kızı Eftalya" that Aleko Bacanos dedicated to her a composition titled Gel Ey Denizin Nazlı Kızı Nûş-i Şarâb Et ("Come on, coy mermaid, drink wine") in the Acem-Aşiran melody type. The song became so famous that its cover versions were performed by the Modern Folk Trio and other notable artists several decades later.

Retirement and death
Eftalya's artistic life of almost 25 years ended with the jubilee night, organized on 4 August 1936 by the "Şirket-i Hayriye"  (today Istanbul City Ferry Line) during a full moon night. Four passenger ferries were decorated, and a stage was constructed on a raft. The ferries sailed from Bebek on the Bosphorus northwards up to Büyükdere, stopping by piers on both sides of the strait. People gathered ashore joined the event with paper lanterns. The program featured also zeibekiko dances, whose music Eftalya enjoyed.

She fell ill during the jubilee event, and died in Istanbul on 15 March 1939. She was interred at Şişli Greek Orthodox Cemetery following the religious funeral service at the Hagia Triada Church.

Discography
  22 tracks of Ottoman classical and Turkish folk music.

References

Bibliography

External links
 "Gel Ey Denizin Nazlı Kızı" by "Deniz Kızı EFTELYA" @YouTube

1891 births
People from Sarıyer
Constantinopolitan Greeks
Turkish people of Greek descent
Musicians of Ottoman classical music
Turkish folk singers
20th-century artists from the Ottoman Empire
20th-century Turkish women singers
20th-century Greek women singers
Pathé Records artists
Columbia Records artists
EMI Records artists
1939 deaths
Burials at Şişli Greek Orthodox Cemetery
Singers from Istanbul